Sulikowo may refer to the following places in West Pomeranian Voivodeship, Poland:

Kolonia Sulikowo 
Sulikowo, Kamień County
Sulikowo, Szczecinek County